The 1971 All-Southwest Conference football team consists of American football players chosen by various organizations for All-Southwest Conference teams for the 1971 NCAA University Division football season.  The selectors for the 1971 season included the Associated Press (AP).

All Southwest selections

Offense

Quarterbacks
 Joe Ferguson, Arkansas (AP-1)

Running backs
 Jim Bertelsen, Texas (AP-1)
 Stahle Vincent, Rice (AP-1)
 Alvin Maxson, SMU (AP-1)

Split ends
 Mike Reppond, Arkansas (AP-1)

Tight ends
 Ronnie Peoples, TCU (AP-1)

Tackles
 Jerry Sisemore, Texas (AP-1)
 Mike Kelson, Arkansas (AP-1)

Guards
 Don Crosslin, Texas (AP-1)
 Leonard Forey, Texas A&M (AP-1)

Centers
 Ron Revard, Arkansas (AP-1)

Defense

Defensive ends
 Ronnie Jones, Arkansas (AP-1)
 Roger Goree, Baylor (AP-1)

Defensive tackles
 Greg Ploetz, Texas (AP-1)
 Ray Dowdy, Texas (AP-1)

Linebackers
 Randy Braband, Texas (AP-1)
 Danny Rhodes, Arkansas (AP-1)
 Larry Molinare, Texas Tech (AP-1)

Defensive backs
 Marc Dove, Texas Tech (AP-1)
 Robert Popelka, SMU (AP-1)
 Alan Lowry, Texas (AP-1)
 David Hoot, Texas A&M (AP-1)

Key
AP = Associated Press

CFHOF = Player inducted into the College Football Hall of Fame

See also
1971 College Football All-America Team

References

All-Southwest Conference
All-Southwest Conference football teams